The PZL-102 Kos (blackbird) is a Polish two-seat touring and training monoplane designed and built by PZL.

Development
First flown on 21 May 1958 by Mieczysław Miłosz the PZL-102 was designed as a semi-aerobatic two-seat light monoplane and was later given the name Kos. The Kos was an all-metal low-wing cantilever monoplane with fabric tail control surfaces. It had a fixed tailwheel landing gear and the prototype had a nose-mounted 65 hp (48 kW) Narkiewicz WN-1 flat-four engine. The Kos had an enclosed cockpit for two side-by-side. After a number of prototypes the production aircraft (designated PZL-102B) first flew in October 1959, with Continental C90 engine and changed wing construction. Only short series was produced, because it needed imported engine.

Operational history
Between 13 May and 8 June 1960 Antoni Szymański made 9000 km commercial flight on PZL-102B on route Warsaw - Vienna - Geneva - Reims - London - Luxembourg - Berlin - Warsaw.

Seven aircraft were sold abroad. Austrian aircraft were operated for agrospraying purposes. Tank filled with chemical agent was placed on the passenger seat.

One PZL-102 has been restored to airworthy condition (markings SP-EFA).

Variants
PZL-102A
Prototypes
PZL-102B
Production variant with Continental C90 engine.
There is another PZL 102B restored in South Africa, based at Jack Taylor Airfield Krugersdorp, and one more in Brazil (PT-BGP)

Operators

Specifications (PZL-102B)

References

Further reading

External links

Photographs

1950s Polish civil utility aircraft
PZL aircraft